The 2011 Shanghai International Film Festival was the 14th such festival devoted to international cinema held in Shanghai, China. It took place from June 11 to June 19, 2011.  The opening and closing ceremonies were held at the Shanghai Grand Theater.

International Jury
The members of the jury for the Golden Goblet Award were:

 Barry Levinson (USA; president of the jury)
 Christopher Hampton (UK)
 Yoichi Sai (Japan)
 Tran Anh Hung (France)
 Paz Vega (Spain)
 Wang Quan'an (China)
 Zhang Jingchu (China)

In competition
The line-up for the Golden Goblet Award consisted of 16 films that were selected from 1,519 entries from 102 countries.

Winners

Golden Goblet Awards

Asian New Talent Award
 Best Director
 Yung-Shing Teng for Return Ticket (China)
 Best Film
 Special Jury Award
 Birthright directed by Naoki Hashimoto (Japan)

References

External links
Official website

Shanghai International Film Festival
Shanghai International Film Festival
Shanghai
Shanghai
21st century in Shanghai